Abdollah Guivian (born 28 June 1960) is an Iranian writer and sociologist whose work focuses on anthropology of religion, media studies and Iranian Armenians. He was the founding editor of the journal Communication Research.
Guivian is credited as the "father of video clips in Iran".
Abdollah Guivian holds a PhD in anthropology and communication in 2006 and is a Professor of Iran Broadcasting University.

Films
 Seven Steps North (2007)
 Lullaby (2006)

Publications/Books
 Grounded theory, Tehran: Elmi Farhangi
 Coding methods for qualitative researchers, Tehran: Elmi Farhangi
 Hasr-e Del, Tehran: Hozeh Honari

Translations
 The Symbolic Construction of Community, Anthony Cohen, Routledge 1985

References

External links

 Abdollah Guivian at IBNA

Living people
Iranian sociologists
University of Tehran alumni
1960 births
Anthropologists of religion
Iranian writers
English–Persian translators
Media studies writers